The 1911 All England Badminton Championships was a badminton tournament held at the Royal Horticultural Hall, Westminster, England from February 22 to February 27, 1911.

The Championship events suffered from a lack of entries but other events such as the mixed doubles handicap attracted 50 pairs.

Frank Chesterton was unable to defend his singles title due to severe rheumatism. There were only three first round matches to determine quarter finalists.

Final results

Men's singles

Women's singles

Men's doubles

Women's doubles

Mixed doubles

References

All England Open Badminton Championships
All England
All England Championships
All England Open Badminton Championships in London
All England Badminton Championships
All England Badminton Championships